Basil Southwood (18 May 1907 – 6 June 1953) was a South African cricketer. He played in five first-class matches for Border from 1926/27 to 1928/29.

See also
 List of Border representative cricketers

References

External links
 

1907 births
1953 deaths
South African cricketers
Border cricketers
Cricketers from Durban